Kristni saga ("the book of Christianity") is an Old Norse account of the Christianization of Iceland in the 10th century and of some later church history. It was probably written in the early or mid-13th century, as it is dependent on the Latin biography of King Olaf Tryggvason written by the monk Gunnlaugr Leifsson around the last decade of the 12th century. This results in Latinate forms of some names. The author also used work by Ari Þorgilsson, probably the now lost longer version of the Íslendingabók, and Laxdæla saga. Based on the region of Iceland with which the text indicates the greatest familiarity, it was probably not written at Skálholt.

Kristni saga is written in "sober, almost dry language". Its structure is odd: after recounting the conversion, it skips some fifty years ahead to the lives of bishops Ísleifr and Gizurr, and then gives an account of the feud between Þorgils and Hafliði that was probably added later, perhaps by Sturla Þórðarson. Finnur Jónsson agreed with Oskar Brenner, who wrote an early book about it, in attributing the work as a whole to Sturla; it shows a similar skill in depicting character through telling incidents, a similar use of verses and conversation, its opening sentence, "Here begins how Christianity came to Iceland", continues directly from the ending of Sturlubók, and it is preserved only in the Hauksbók manuscript, where it immediately follows Landnámabók.

Whereas many accounts of Iceland's conversion to Christianity occur within the context of longer works, lives of Óláfr Tryggvason or Sagas of Icelanders, Kristni saga sets out to tell the history of Icelandic Christianity independently, as its opening sentence explicitly states: Nú hefr þat, hversu kristni kom á Ísland ‘Now this is the beginning of how Christianity came to Iceland.

References

Further reading
 Oskar Brenner. Über die Kristni-Saga: kritische Beiträge zur altnordischen Literaturgeschichte. Munich: Kaiser, 1878.  
 Claudio Albani. Ricerche attorno alla Kristnisaga: nota. Milan: Istituto Lombardo di Scienze e Lettere, 1968.

External links
 Íslendingabók; Kristni saga: The Book of Icelanders; The Story of the Conversion, tr. Siân Grønlie, Viking Society for Northern Research Text Series 18, London: Viking Society for Northern Research, 2006, pdf

History of Christianity in Iceland
Sagas